Melawi Regency is a regency of West Kalimantan province of Indonesia. It was created on 18 December 2003 from part of Sintang Regency. It covers an area of 10,640.8 km2, and had a population of 178,645 at the 2010 Census and 228,270 at the 2020 Census; the official estimate as at mid 2021 was 231,242. The principal town lies at Nanga Pinoh.

Administrative Districts 
Melawi Regency consists of eleven districts (kecamatan), tabulated below with their areas and their populations at the 2010 Census and the 2020 Census, together with the official estimates as at mid 2021. The table also includes the locations of the district administrative centres, the number of administrative villages (rural desa and urban kelurahan) in each district, and its post code.

References

Regencies of West Kalimantan